Toxic Waste is a line of sour candies owned and marketed by American company Candy Dynamics Inc., which is headquartered in Indianapolis, Indiana.  The products are sold primarily in the United States and Canada as well as several international markets such as the United Kingdom, Ireland and South Africa. The toxic waste candy is packed in novelty drum containers, each holding 16 pieces of sour candy which come in five different flavors.

Production and distribution 
Some Toxic Waste products have a hard, sour exterior and a sour interior . Toxic Waste candy products are made in Brazil, Pakistan and Spain. The product is distributed in the United States, United Kingdom, by Newbridge Foods of Bromborough, Wirral, Europe, Canada, South Africa and other countries.

There are five original flavors: apple, black cherry, watermelon, lemon and blue raspberry. A purple container was also introduced, containing the flavors blueberry, blackberry, black cherry and grape. In addition to the purple drum, five new flavors were introduced in the red drum variety: raspberry, cranberry, red pear, strawberry and red grape, and a further five flavors - lime, kiwi, melon, green apple and green pear - were introduced in the green drum. The brand also includes Smog Balls, Goop (discontinued in the USA), Slime Lickers, Hi Voltage Bubblegum (discontinued in the USA), Short Circuits Bubblegum (discontinued in the USA), Toxic Waste Gum Balls (discontinued in the USA), and Mutant Gummy Worms. In 2007, the Nuclear Sludge chew bar variety was introduced, but it was not as popular with consumers compared to the other varieties. Nuclear sludge attained sales of $32,000 in 2010. Another product is Toxic Waste Sour Candy sprays.

Nutritional information 
Calories-25 per candyTotal fat 0 g,Sodium 0 mg,Total carbohydrates 13 g,Sugars 11 g,Protein 0 g.

Toxic Waste Challenge 
The container features a challenge how long buyers can keep a candy in their mouths. The manufacturers encourage buyers to compete against a friend. There is a caution on the drum stating that sensitive individuals should not consume the product. Chicago Sun-Times reporter Kevin Allen notes that the candy gives some palatable sweetness after the initial strong sour flavor in the mouth.

See also
 List of candies
 List of confectionery brands

References

External links 
 Official US Website
 Official UK Website

Brand name confectionery